Before She Was Harriet is a 2017 children's picture book written by Lesa Cline-Ransome and illustrated by James E. Ransome, first published by Holiday House. It was awarded an honorary Coretta Scott King Award in 2018.

Synopsis 
This children's picture book details the life of Harriet Tubman in a free verse journey on a train. It begins with Tubman as an old woman and moves backwards chronologically. The author outlines the many roles of Tubman: a suffragist, a boatman who ferried slaves across the Combahee River, a Union spy, a nurse for soldiers, a savior who helped her parents flee from slavery, a conductor on the Underground Railroad, a slave named Minty, and finally a young slave named Araminta. She chooses to change her name to Harriet when she leaves slavery. The book ends with a picture of Tubman sitting on a train, finally free.

Background 
The book was written and illustrated by husband and wife team Lesa Cline-Ransome and James E. Ransome. They have previously collaborated on fifteen books together. Cline-Ransome was nervous about approaching a book on Tubman, as there were already so many of them. Her husband did some research and suggested she write about Tubman's many roles in life. Ransome had already illustrated books about slavery before, so finding references was not a problem. Instead of painting historically accurate images, he focused on making them emotionally accurate.

Reception 
This book was very well received. Horn Book Magazine wrote about James Ransome illustrating Harriet's face at different angles, but always with determination. In a starred Publishers Weekly review praises the author's use of beautiful concise language and the illustrator's "lush scenes." A starred Booklist review, mentions how the poetry is simple enough for children while still being sophisticated in content. The critic says, "Libraries likely already have many Harriet Tubman books, but this well designed, unique approach warrants making room for one more." The publication also included it in their list of the "Top 10 Biographies for Youth." Critics from Kirkus Reviews enjoyed James Ransom's double paged watercolor illustrations, as they would help children fix themselves "in each time and place as the text takes them further into the past." Barbara L. Talcroft from Children's Literature says, "Lesa Cline-Raonsome and James E. Ransome have created a fitting tribute to her with Before She Was Harriet. The Ransomes take readers on a journey through time, exploring the many roles Harriet Tubman assumed in her extraordinary life."

It was awarded the 2018 honorary Coretta Scott King Award .

References 

2017 children's books
American picture books
American children's books
Biographies about African-American people
Harriet Tubman